Lawrence & Holford was an architectural firm based in the U.S. state of Oregon, formed by Ellis F. Lawrence and William G. Holford and established in 1913. The firm designed many buildings that are listed on the National Register of Historic Places (NRHP).

Works on the NRHP in Oregon
Alpha Phi Sorority House, 1050 Hilyard St, Eugene
Fred E. Chambers House and Grounds, 1151 Irving Rd, Eugene
Elsinore Theater, 170 High St SE, Salem
Hall–Chaney House, 10200 SE Cambridge Lane, Milwaukie
Dr. Harry M. Hendershott House, 824 NW Albemarle Terrace, Portland
James Hickey House, 6719 SE 29th Ave, Portland
James M. and Paul R. Kelty House, 675 3rd St, Lafayette
T. A. Livesley House, 533 Lincoln St S, Salem
Paul C. Murphy House, 3574 E Burnside St, Portland
Isaac Neuberger House, 630 NW Alpine Terrace, Portland
John V. G. Posey House, 2107 SW Greenwood Rd, Portland
O. L. Price House, 2681 SW Buena Vista Dr, Portland
Maurice Seitz House, 1495 SW Clifton St, Portland
Stanley C. E. Smith House, 1905 SW Greenwood Rd, Portland
John A. Sprouse, Jr. House, 2826 NW Cumberland Rd, Portland
St. John's Episcopal Church, 110 NE Alder St, Toledo (attributed to Lawrence, Holford & Allyn)
Frank C. Stettler House, 2606 NW Lovejoy St, Portland
Fred E. Taylor House, 2873 NW Shenandoah Terrace, Portland
University of Oregon Library and Memorial Quadrangle, Kincaid St at E 15th Ave, Eugene (attributed to Lawrence, Holford, Allyn & Bean)
Women's Memorial Quadrangle Ensemble, bounded by University St, Johnson Lane and Pioneer Cemetery, University of Oregon campus, Eugene

References

Defunct architecture firms based in Oregon
1913 establishments in Oregon